is a Japanese yakuza film directed by Rokurō Mochizuki starring Ryo Ishibashi and Asami Sawaki, who was making her film debut. The film was based on a novel by Yukio Yamanouchi who also appears as an actor in the film. The Japanese title of the film begins with the character 新, shin (new), to distinguish this movie from a 1989 film  (Lonely or Sad Hitman), also based on a novel by Yamanouchi but unrelated in plot.

Plot
After 10 years in prison, yakuza hitman Takashi Tachibana is returning to a new mob scene where his code of honor is outdated. The old violent gangs have now turned to drug dealing as their main business. His old mob presents him with a bundle of cash and Yuki, a call girl who is addicted to drugs as he once was. Tachibana falls for the girl and tries to rehabilitate her which eventually causes trouble with his own gang and rivals as well.

Cast
 Ryo Ishibashi as Takashi Tachibana
 Asami Sawaki as Yuki Tajima
 Kazuhiko Kanayama as Yuji Takayama
 Tatsuo Yamada as Shimoyama
 Tetsuya Yūki as Hirakawa
 Zenkichi Yoneyama as Wada
 Toshiyuki Kitami as Mizohashi
 Yukio Yamanouchi as Yoshimura

Release
The film was released theatrically in Japan on July 1, 1995. A DVD version with English subtitles which included an interview with director Mochizuki came out May 31, 2005.

Reception
At the 5th Japan Film Professional Awards, Another Lonely Hitman won the award for Best Film of 1995 and Rokurō Mochizuki was named Best Director. Ryo Ishibashi took the Best Actor award at the same ceremony.

References

External links
 
  (Review)

Yakuza films
Films directed by Rokuro Mochizuki
1990s Japanese films